The third season of the television series The Wire of 12 episodes first aired in the United States on HBO in 2004, from September 19 to December 19. It introduces Baltimore's local politicians and the upstart drug dealing Stanfield organization while continuing to examine the Barksdale Organization and the Baltimore Police Department.

The third season aired on Sundays at 9:00 pm ET in the United States to widespread critical acclaim. The season was released on DVD as a five disc boxed set under the title of The Wire: The Complete Third Season on August 8, 2006 by HBO Video.

Production
Following the death of Robert F. Colesberry, director Joe Chappelle joined the production staff as a co-executive producer and continued to regularly direct episodes. Baltimore Sun writer and political journalist William F. Zorzi joined the writing staff in the third season and brought a wealth of experience to the show's examination of Baltimore politics.

David Simon had originally hoped to create a city hall spinoff show, which would run in tandem with subsequent seasons of The Wire, and had even written scripts for it. But HBO declined, according to Simon: "HBO said, 'No, we only want one show that nobody is watching in Baltimore, not two!'."

Cast

Starring cast
The third season returned with the focus on investigating the Barksdale Organization and introducing new characters such as the rival Stanfield Organization and local politicians. The returning cast consisted of Dominic West as Detective Jimmy McNulty, whose insubordinate tendencies and personal problems continued to overshadow his ability; Lance Reddick as Lieutenant Cedric Daniels, now commanding his own unit; Kima Greggs, played by Sonja Sohn, now  McNulty's new partner within the unit; Clarke Peters as Lester Freamon; and Deirdre Lovejoy as Assistant State's Attorney Rhonda Pearlman.

Wood Harris reprised his role as incarcerated drug kingpin Avon Barksdale. Idris Elba's character Stringer Bell continued to run the Barksdale Organization in Avon's absence. Andre Royo returned as Bubbles, who continued to indulge his drug addiction and act as an occasional informant.

Deputy Commissioner of Operations William Rawls (John Doman) and Acting Commissioner Ervin Burrell (Frankie Faison), the two commanding officers,  seem to be more concerned with politics and their own careers than actual police work. Wendell Pierce portrayed veteran homicide detective Bunk Moreland. 

The new season saw several previously recurring characters assuming larger starring roles, including Seth Gilliam as Sergeant Ellis Carver, Domenick Lombardozzi as Detective Thomas "Herc" Hauk, Detective Leander Sydnor (Corey Parker Robinson), Detective Roland Pryzbylewski (Jim True-Frost), Bodie Broadus (J.D. Williams), Omar Little (Michael K. Williams), and Major Howard "Bunny" Colvin (Robert Wisdom). 

Colvin commanded the Western district where the Barksdale organization operated, and nearing retirement, he came up with a radical new method of dealing with the drug problem. Herc and Carver joined the Western District Drug Enforcement Unit under Colvin's command. Sydnor, a rising young star in the police department in season 1, returned to the cast as part of the major crimes unit along with Pryzbylewski. 

Bodie had been seen gradually rising in the Barksdale organization since the first episode; he was born to their trade and showed a fierce aptitude for it. Omar had a vendetta against the Barksdale organization and gave them all of his lethal attention. A new starring character was also introduced in the third season: Tommy Carcetti (Aidan Gillen), an ambitious city councilman.

Several members of the second season starring cast did not return for the third season with the change in focus and the termination of some characters' storylines. Chris Bauer (Frank Sobotka), Paul Ben-Victor (Spiros Vondas) and Amy Ryan (Beadie Russell) all left the starring cast with the third season. Ryan returned as a guest star for a short scene at the end of the season.

Main cast
 Dominic West as Jimmy McNulty (12 episodes)
 John Doman as William Rawls (10 episodes)
 Idris Elba as Russell "Stringer" Bell (12 episodes)
 Frankie Faison as Ervin Burrell (10 episodes)
 Aidan Gillen as Tommy Carcetti (12 episodes)
 Wood Harris as Avon Barksdale (11 episodes)
 Deirdre Lovejoy as Rhonda Pearlman (10 episodes)
 Clarke Peters as Lester Freamon (11 episodes)
 Wendell Pierce as Bunk Moreland (8 episodes)
 Lance Reddick as Cedric Daniels (12 episodes)
 Andre Royo as Reginald "Bubbles" Cousins (10 episodes)
 Sonja Sohn as Kima Greggs (12 episodes)
 Jim True-Frost as Roland Pryzbylewski (9 episodes)
 Robert Wisdom as Howard "Bunny" Colvin (12 episodes)
 Seth Gilliam as Ellis Carver (11 episodes)
 Domenick Lombardozzi as Herc (11 episodes)
 J. D. Williams as Bodie Broadus (11 episodes)
 Michael K. Williams as Omar Little (10 episodes)
 Corey Parker Robinson as Leander Sydnor (8 episodes)

Recurring roles
Many guest stars from the earlier seasons reprised their roles. Proposition Joe (Robert F. Chew), the East Side's cautious drug kingpin, became more cooperative with the Barksdale Organization. His lieutenant "Cheese" (Method Man) became involved in the Major Crimes Unit investigation. Brother Mouzone (Michael Potts) returned to Baltimore looking for revenge. Hassan Johnson reprised his role as incarcerated Barksdale enforcer Wee-Bey Brice. Tray Chaney continued to portray Barksdale crew chief Poot Carr. Leo Fitzpatrick returned as hapless drug addict Johnny Weeks. 

Michael Hyatt and Shamyl Brown reprised their respective roles as Brianna Barksdale and Donette with both characters dealing with the loss of D'Angelo Barksdale. Michael Kostroff returned as the Barksdales' retainered defense attorney Maurice Levy. Isiah Whitlock, Jr. reprised his role as corrupt State Senator Clay Davis, who continued to be involved with Barksdale money. Stringer continued to use Shamrock (Richard Burton) to insulate himself from investigation. Background characters like Barksdale enforcers Tank and Country also returned. Omar Little's crew continued to rob the Barksdale Organization and consisted of his boyfriend Dante (Ernest Waddell), partners Tosha Mitchell (Edwina Findley) and Kimmy (Kelli R. Brown), and advisor Butchie (S. Robert Morgan).

Many guest stars also reprised their characters from the police department. Returning guest stars in the homicide unit include Delaney Williams as Sergeant Jay Landsman, Ed Norris as Detective Ed Norris, and Brian Anthony Wilson as Detective Vernon Holley. Al Brown and Jay Landsman reprised their roles as patrol division officers Stan Valchek and Dennis Mello. Michael Salconi recurred as veteran Western patrolman Michael Santangelo.

New recurring characters in the third season were also spread between the Street and the Law. The upstart Stanfield Organization introduced several new roles: Marlo Stanfield (Jamie Hector), a ruthless leader seeking to challenge Avon's dominance; Chris Partlow (Gbenga Akinnagbe), Stanfield's chief enforcer; Felicia "Snoop" Pearson (Felicia Pearson), Partlow's protege; Norris Davis as rimshop owner and advisor Vinson; Brandon Fobbs as crew chief Fruit; and Melvin T. Russell and Justin Burley as young drug dealers Jamal and Justin. The Barksdale Organization also found several new recruits: Slim Charles (Anwan Glover), Avon's new chief enforcer; Bernard (Melvin Jackson, Jr.), responsible for procuring disposable cell phones; and Dennis "Cutty" Wise (Chad Coleman), a newly released convict uncertain of his future. 

The introduction of a political storyline brought many new characters. Glynn Turman played Mayor Clarence Royce, the incumbent whom Carcetti planned to unseat. Cleo Reginald Pizana portrayed Coleman Parker, Royce's chief-of-staff. Brandy Burre appeared as Theresa D'Agostino, a political campaign consultant. Frederick Strother performed as Odell Watkins, a state delegate and political king-maker. Christopher Mann played Carcetti's city council colleague Anthony Gray.

Several new police characters also debuted with the third season. Gregory L. Williams played Michael Crutchfield, a cantankerous homicide detective. Joilet F. Harris had a small role as Caroline Massey, a new officer in the Major Crimes Unit. The focus on Colvin's command of the Western District introduced several new characters both in Carver's Drug Enforcement Unit and in the Patrol Division. Carver's squad included Kenneth Dozerman (Rick Otto), Anthony Colicchio (Benjamin Busch), Lloyd "Truck" Garrick (Ryan Sands), and Lambert (Nakia Dillard). New rookie patrol officer Aaron Castor (Lee Everett Cox), Brian Baker (Derek Horton) and Officer Turner (Darrell M. Smith) also featured.

Episodes

Reception
On Rotten Tomatoes, the season has an approval rating of 100% with an average score of 10 out of 10 based on 21 reviews. The website's critical consensus reads, "In its third season, The Wires taut, unflinching examination of Baltimore expands from the criminal underworld to the top of the political machine." The season holds a score of 98/100 indicating "universal acclaim" on Metacritic.

Awards and nominations
57th Primetime Emmy Awards
Nomination for Outstanding Writing for a Drama Series (George Pelecanos & David Simon) (Episode: "Middle Ground")

References

External links 
 
 

2004 American television seasons
 3